Pizza by the slice is a fast food sold by pizzerias and food stands, making it also often a street food.  The pizza slices may be plain or have various toppings. Some restaurants and pizza stands only sell pizza by the slice, while others sell both slices and whole pizzas. The jumbo slice is a large-sized slice of New York-style pizza made in areas of Washington, D.C. Pizza al taglio is a style of rectangular slice of pizza that originated in Rome and is typically sold by weight.

Overview
Some pizzerias and food stands sell pizza by the slice and whole pizza pies, and some only sell slices. Pizza by the slice is typically pre-baked and pre-sliced, and is characteristically kept warm under heat lamps. Slices are sometimes re-heated or have toppings added before going back into the oven briefly. Selling pizza by the slice offers an economic and speedy dining option to a purchaser while optimizing profits for the seller, as the total value of a pie's slices typically is considerably more than selling a whole pie. The price of pizza slices is also typically significantly less than the cost of a whole pie.

Pizza by the slice is prevalent in the United States. There are over 1,000 pizzerias and "slice shops" in New York City selling New York-style pizza by the slice, with Sicilian pizza slices also often available. It is a common street food there, and the most popular way pizza is ordered.  There is a lively competition for which pizzeria sells the "best" slice in the city.

The dish is common in some areas of the Balkans such as Bulgaria.

Pizza by the slice is also manufactured frozen, and is sometimes packaged in individual microwavable portions.

Jumbo slice

The jumbo slice is an oversized slice of New York-style pizza sold in areas of Washington, D.C., especially favored as a late-night snack by bargoers after closing time.

Pizza al taglio

Pizza al taglio is an Italian pizza variety of rectangular pizza that is sold by the slice, typically by weight. The dish originated in Rome, Italy, and is common there, as well as being sold elsewhere around the world. The dough for Pizza al taglio is sometimes parbaked ahead of time, allowing sauce and various toppings to be added later and the pie finished in the oven when needed.

See also
 List of street foods
 Pizzetta

References

Further reading

External links
 
 

Pizza
Pizza in New York City
Street food
Sliced foods